Sentimiento, Elegancia, & Maldad (S.E.M.) (English: Sentiment, Elegance, & Malice) is the first studio album by singer-songwriter Arcángel. It was released on November 19, 2013, by Pina Records. The first single from the album, "Hace Mucho Tiempo", was released on June 21, 2013.

Track listing
 Dios Te Bendiga
 Hace Mucho Tiempo
 Contigo Quiero Amores
 Sola (featuring De La Ghetto)
 Ire A Buscarte
 Gucci Boys Club
 Cuando Tu No Estas
 Como Tiene Que Ser
 Pakas de 100 (featuring Daddy Yankee)
 S.E.M.
 Diferente
 Ayer Escuche Una Voz (featuring Ñengo Flow)
 Me, Myself & My Money
 Que Le Den
 Le Llego Donde Sea (featuring Genio & Baby Johnny)
 Lentamente
 Tiene Un Piquete
 Por La Plata Baila El Mono

All solo tracks wrote by Austin Santos, except the track "Lentamente" (wrote by Gabriel Cruz).

Charts

Weekly charts

Year-end charts

Certifications

See also
List of number-one Billboard Latin Albums from the 2010s

References

2013 albums
Albums produced by Nely
Arcángel (singer) albums
Latin pop albums by Puerto Rican artists
Pina Records albums